Sodomizing the Archedangel is an EP by the French symphonic black metal band Anorexia Nervosa. It was self-produced, and released in 1999 via Osmose Productions. It marks the transition from the band's previous industrial metal style to symphonic black metal, and is their first release to feature long-time vocalist Nicolas Saint-Morand (also known as R.M.S. Hreidmarr) and keyboardist Neb Xort.

Track listing

The track "Divine White Light of a Cumming Decadence" would be re-recorded for the band's second studio album, Drudenhaus.

Personnel
 R.M.S. Hreidmarr – vocals
 Stéphane Bayle – guitar
 Pierre Couquet – bass guitar
 Neb Xort – keyboards
 Nilcas Vant – drums, percussion

External links
 Sodomizing the Archedangel at Encyclopaedia Metallum

Anorexia Nervosa (band) albums
1999 albums